The Pudu Prison, also known as Pudu Jail, was a prison in Kuala Lumpur, Malaysia. Built in phases by the British colonial government between 1891 and 1895, it stood on Jalan Shaw (now Jalan Hang Tuah). The construction began with its 394-metre prison wall at a cost of Straits $16,000, and had been adorned with the world's longest mural at one point in its history. The cells were small and dark, each equipped with a window only the size of a shoebox.

The prison complex was largely demolished by December 2012 to make way for urban development. At the request of heritage conservationists and the public, the main gate and a portion of the exterior wall have been preserved and now form part of the park surrounding the Bukit Bintang City Centre development and mall, which occupies the site of the former prison.

Early years

Pudu Prison, also known as Pudu Jail, was built on the site of a former Chinese burial ground. At the time, Pudu was a dense jungle area with tigers occasionally roaming around. Construction began in 1891, using convicts as workforce. It took about four years and was finally complete in 1895. The first governor of Pudu Prison was Lt. Col. J.A.B. Ellen.

A few months after its completion, in August 1895, a cholera outbreak struck the prison and killed a few hundred inmates. Later, it was found that the plague was caused by the prison's water supply system, which relied on an old well belonging to the Chinese cemetery previously on the site. An inspection by the British colonial authorities revealed that the water in the well was severely contaminated by deadly microorganisms. The water problem was not fixed until 1898.

In 1911, Richard Alfred Ernest Clark, a former soldier of the third battalion of the Middlesex Regiment, was one of the European warders at Pudu Prison.

Early in its history, Pudu Prison was the only prison in the state of Selangor and used to imprison men and women with short sentences. The prison was also self-sufficient as it had a vegetable garden that could produce enough food for its inmates annually.

The prison later housed criminals including drug offenders and was a location for administering corporal punishment by caning. The canings were administered in a special "caning area", so marked, which was not inside the main building but on the prison grounds.

Mural
In 1984, an inmate named Khong Yen Chong used some 2,000 litres of paint to create an impressive mural of tropical scenes. It measured some 860 feet by 14 feet and was mentioned in the Guinness Book of Records as the longest mural in the world. Khong, as an inmate, was not able to complete the mural. He returned later as a free man and volunteered his time to complete his masterpiece.

World War II and later

During World War II, the Japanese occupation forces incarcerated many Allied POWs there.

In 1986, the Pudu Prison siege took place. In this incident, a group of prisoners seized and held two members of the prison staff as hostages over a period of six days. The siege was resolved when Malaysian police stormed the prison. They successfully rescued the hostages and subdued the prisoners without loss of life.

As Kuala Lumpur entered the 1990s, concerns were raised about the viability of the prison's location on prime real estate. Security was a major issue due to the prison's proximity to fast-rising commercial developments such as Imbi and Bukit Bintang. Additionally, the prison layout and facilities had become obsolete.

In 1996, after 101 years as a prison, Pudu Prison was formally closed and the inmates were moved to Sungai Buloh Prison and Kajang Prison. It continued to be used until 2009 as a day-holding facility for prisoners attending court hearings. It was used as a museum for a period in 1997. Additionally, eight supporters of the Hindu Rights Action Force were arrested and incarcerated in Pudu Prison following the 2007 HINDRAF rally. They were later released due to lack of evidence.

In June 2009, the government finally decided to demolish the complex by developing it in phases. When the MP for Bukit Bintang, Fong Kui Lun (DAP) asked why the building was not being retained as part of Malaysia's heritage, Deputy Finance Minister Awang Adek Hussain (UMNO-BN) replied: "In our opinion, it's not something to be proud of." The hanging chamber, along with the prison hospital, were the first structures to be torn down in October that year.

In June 2010, the eastern wall of the Pudu Prison complex was demolished to make way for a road-widening project. By December 2012, all buildings within the Pudu Prison complex were completely demolished. The government agreed to maintain a part of the exterior wall and landmark main gate after being petitioned by conservationists and the general public. These remaining features have been incorporated into the fountain park forming part of Mitsui Lalaport Mall, which now occupies the site of the prison.

The site was redeveloped by the BBCC Development Sdn Bhd, a joint venture between EcoWorld, UDA and EPF Board, into the Bukit Bintang City Centre. In 2022, Bukit Bintang City Centre was opened.

Famous inmates
Botak Chin, an infamous gangster who was allegedly betrayed by his own men, was executed here on 11 June 1981 for the possession of firearms. In the 1980s Leonard Glenn Francis "Fat Leonard" spent time interned there.

In 1986 Kevin Barlow and Brian Chambers, both Australian nationals, were executed in Pudu Prison for trafficking heroin.  In 1989, Derrick Gregory, a British national was also hanged for heroin trafficking.

Artifacts
Some artifacts from the prison, including the fountain and the gable inscribed with the year "1895", were preserved and exhibited at the Malaysia Prison Museum in Bandar Hilir, Malacca; the museum itself being a former colonial prison opened in 1860.

References

External links

Illustrations from the 1997/98 Pudu Prison exhibition at the World Corporal Punishment Research website.
"Pudu Jail museum is a family crowd-puller", New Straits Times, Kuala Lumpur, 23 December 1997.
Trips in Kuala Lumpur
Pudu Prison Demolition, 13 October 2009

Demolished buildings and structures in Malaysia
Defunct prisons in Malaysia
British colonial prisons in Asia
Reportedly haunted locations
1895 establishments in British Malaya
2008 disestablishments in Malaysia
Demolished prisons